Kaingaue David (born March 20, 1995 in Tarawa) is an I-Kiribati sprinter.  She competed in the 100 metres competition at the 2012 Summer Olympics; she ran the preliminaries in a personal best of 13.61 seconds, which did not qualify her for Round 1. Kaingaue is a  member of the Church of Jesus Christ of Latter-day Saints.

References

External links
 

1995 births
Living people
I-Kiribati female sprinters
Olympic athletes of Kiribati
Athletes (track and field) at the 2012 Summer Olympics
People from the Gilbert Islands
Olympic female sprinters
I-Kiribati Latter Day Saints